William Arnold Landvoigt (February 6, 1879 – December 15, 1970) was an American rugby union player who represented the German Empire in the 1900 Summer Olympics. He was a member of the German rugby union team, which won the silver medal. Germany was represented at the tournament by the FC 1880 Frankfurt rather than an official national team.

References

External links

 

1879 births
1970 deaths
Rugby union players at the 1900 Summer Olympics
Olympic rugby union players of Germany
Olympic silver medalists for Germany
SC 1880 Frankfurt players
Rugby union wings
Medalists at the 1900 Summer Olympics
Sportspeople from Washington, D.C.
American rugby union players
United States Secret Service agents